Acasanga dimidiosanguinea is a species of beetle in the family Cerambycidae. It was described by Ernst Fuchs in 1963. It is known from Colombia.

References

Hemilophini
Beetles described in 1963